Mohamed Mahroof (c. 1950 – 3 December 2012) was a Sri Lankan politician, a member of the Parliament of Sri Lanka and a government minister. He was a member of the Colombo Municipal Council.

References

2012 deaths
Sri Lankan Muslims
Members of the 11th Parliament of Sri Lanka
Members of the 12th Parliament of Sri Lanka
Members of the 13th Parliament of Sri Lanka
Government ministers of Sri Lanka
United National Party politicians
Year of birth uncertain